The 2014–15 Danish 1st Division season is the 19th season of the Danish 1st Division league championship, governed by the Danish Football Association.

The division-champion and runners-up are promoted to the 2015–16 Danish Superliga. The teams in the 11th and 12th places are relegated to the 2015–16 Danish 2nd Divisions.

Participants
AGF and Viborg FF finished the 2013–14 season of the Superliga in 11th and 12th place, respectively, and were relegated to the 1st Division. They replaced Silkeborg IF and Hobro IK, who were promoted to the 2014–15 Danish Superliga.

Skive IK and FC Roskilde won promotion from the 2013–14 Danish 2nd Divisions. They replaced BK Marienlyst and Hvidovre IF.

Stadia and locations

Personnel and sponsoring 
Note: Flags indicate national team as has been defined under FIFA eligibility rules. Players and Managers may hold more than one non-FIFA nationality.

Managerial changes

League table

Top scorers

Updated to matches played on 6. June

See also
2014–15 in Danish football

References

External links
  Danish FA

2014–15 in Danish football
Danish 1st Division
Danish 1st Division seasons